Ferdinand of Castile (1238 - before 1264/1269), Infante of Castile, was the son of King Ferdinand III of Castile and Joan, Countess of Ponthieu.

He was the Count of Aumale, Baron of Montgomery and of Noyelles-sur-Mer.

Biography 
Ferdinand was born in 1238. After the death of his father in Seville on 30 May 1252, Joan of Danmartin and her older son left for France, from which Joan would never return. In France, Ferdinand inherited the County of Aumale and the Baronies of Montgomery and Noyelles-sur-Mer.

Although the date of his death is unknown, some authors put his death before 1264, while others indicate it must have been before July 25, 1269 because, at that time, his brother Infante Luis could be found in Toledo making a donation to the Order of Calatrava entitled "Heir to the County of Pontis".

Marriage and Descendants 
He was married to Laura of Montfort, daughter of Amaury de Montfort, Count of Toulouse and Lord of Montfort. The marriage produced one live birth:

 John I of Ponthieu (died 1302). He inherited the possessions of his father and mother and died at the Battle of the Golden Spurs on about 11 July 1302.

See also 
 Crown of Castile

Notes

References

Bibliography 
 

 

 

1238 births
1260s deaths
Sons of kings